Thornton Crossroads/104th station (sometimes stylized as Thornton Crossroads•104th) is a station on the N Line of the Denver RTD commuter rail system in Thornton, Colorado. It is located on Colorado Boulevard, slightly south of 104th Avenue. The station opened on September 21, 2020.

References

RTD commuter rail stations
Railway stations in the United States opened in 2020
2020 establishments in Colorado
Thornton, Colorado